Holman House may refer to:

in Australia

 Holman House, Dover Heights, Sydney, New South Wales

in the United States
(by state, then city)

 J. D. Holman House, Ozark, Alabama, listed on the National Register of Historic Places (NRHP) in Dale County
 M. P. Holman House, Faribault, Minnesota, listed on the NRHP in Rice County
 John Holman House, Humboldt, Nebraska, listed on the NRHP in Richardson County
 White-Holman House, Raleigh, North Carolina, listed on the NRHP in Wake County
 Rufus C. Holman House, Portland, Oregon, NRHP-listed
 Cardwell–Holman House, Portland, Oregon, NRHP-listed
 J.B. Holman House, Batesburg-Leesville, South Carolina, NRHP-listed
 Judge William Shields Holman House, Bay City, Texas, listed on the NRHP in Texas
 Samuel Holman House, Park City, Utah, listed on the NRHP in Summit County